The Taylor-Zent House, also known as Hart Funeral Home, is a historic home located at 715 Jefferson Street in Huntington, Indiana, USA. The house is an excellent example of the Romanesque Revival style of architecture. It was built in 1896-98 for Enos T. Taylor, a self-made businessman and banker.

It was listed on the National Register of Historic Places in 1982. It is located in the North Jefferson Street Historic District.

References

Further reading
 Peat, Wilbur.  Indiana Houses of the Nineteenth Century.  Indianapolis: Indiana Historical Society, 1962, 160–161.

National Register of Historic Places in Huntington County, Indiana
Romanesque Revival architecture in Indiana
Houses completed in 1898
Houses in Huntington County, Indiana
Houses on the National Register of Historic Places in Indiana
Historic district contributing properties in Indiana